The 2016 Dubai Tour was a road cycling stage race that took place in Dubai between 3 and 6 February 2016. It was the third edition of the Dubai Tour and was rated as a 2.HC event as part of the 2016 UCI Asia Tour.

The race was made up of four stages. Three of these were suited for sprinters, with the third stage ending with an uphill finish to the Hatta Dam. The defending champion was Mark Cavendish, who won the 2015 Dubai Tour for  but was riding for his new team, .

Marcel Kittel won the first stage to take the lead of the race. Elia Viviani won the second stage and took over the race lead. The Hatta Dam stage was won by Juan José Lobato, with Giacomo Nizzolo ( taking the overall lead of the race. Kittel won the final stage and, with the help of bonus seconds, took the overall victory. Nizzolo was second, with Lobato third.

Teams 

Sixteen teams were invited to take part in the race. Ten of these were UCI WorldTeams; there were also three UCI Professional Continental teams and three UCI Continental teams. There were a maximum of eight riders per team; since not every team brought their full quota of riders, 123 riders were entered in the startlist.

Stages

Stage 1 

3 February 2016 – Dubai–Fujairah,

Stage 2 

4 February – Dubai–Palm Jumeirah

Stage 3 

5 February – Dubai–Hatta Dam,

Stage 4 

6 February – Dubai–Burj Khalifa,

Classification leadership table

References

External links 

 

2016
Dubai Tour
Dubai Tour